
The following lists events that happened during 1833 in South Africa.

Events
 David Hume, explorer and big-game hunter, becomes the first European to enter the country of the Bamangwato (Botswana).
 All slaves were emancipated in the British Empire.

History of South Africa